Perdóname, señor is a Spanish crime drama television series created by Frank Ariza and written by Antonio Onetti, starring Paz Vega, Stany Coppet and Jesús Castro, dealing about drug trafficking in the Coast of Cádiz. It aired on Telecinco from May 2017 to July 2017.

Premise 
Lucía Medina, a nun, returns to her hometown in Barbate. There she meets Rafa, her son, raised by her brother Miguel, and Bruno Lachambre, Rafa's (unaware) biological father, Lucía's former love interest and drug lord.

Cast

Production and release 

Created by Frank Ariza, Perdóname, señor was produced by Gossip Events Productions and Mediaset España. The screenplay was authored by Alejandro Onetti whereas the episodes were directed by Alejandro Bazzano, Alberto Ruiz Rojo, Rafa Montesinos and Ariza himself. It consisted of 8 episodes with an average running time of 70 min. The series was shot in Barbate. Shooting locations for action scenes (such as chases and drug deliveries) included the Hierbabuena Beach, the Nuestra Señora del Carmen Beach, Los Alemanes Beach and the Barbate tidal marsh.

The series premiered on Telecinco on 25 May 2017. The broadcasting run ended on 20 July 2017. The series was a great ratings success for Telecinco, averaging a 19.1% audience share and leading its time slot in 7 out of 8 episodes.

References 
Citations

Bibliography
 
 

Telecinco network series
2017 Spanish television series debuts
2017 Spanish television series endings
2010s Spanish drama television series
2010s romantic drama television series
Spanish crime television series
Television shows set in Andalusia
Television shows filmed in Spain
Television series about illegal drug trade
Spanish-language television shows
Television series about nuns